Aaron Chase Sabato (born June 4, 1999) is an American professional baseball first baseman in the Minnesota Twins organization. He was selected 27th overall by the Twins in the 2020 Major League Baseball draft.

Amateur career
Sabato grew up in Rye Brook, New York and attended the Brunswick School in Greenwich, Connecticut, where he was a four year starter on the school's baseball team. As a junior he batted .444 with nine home runs, 20 RBI and 20 runs scored. As a senior, he batted .560 with 14 home runs in 22 games and was named first team All-Connecticut.

After graduating, Sabato enrolled at the University of North Carolina at Chapel Hill where he played college baseball. As a true freshman, Sabato led the Tar Heels with a .343 batting average and with 79 hits, 25 doubles and 63 RBIs while setting a UNC freshman record with 18 home runs. He was named the National Freshman Hitter of the Year by the National Collegiate Baseball Writers Association and the Atlantic Coast Conference (ACC) Freshman of the Year, as well as first team All-ACC and as a first team All-American by the American Baseball Coaches Association and a third team All-American by Baseball America.

Sabato entered his sophomore season on the watchlist for the Golden Spikes Award and was named a first team preseason All-American by Baseball America, Perfect Game and the Collegiate Baseball Newspaper. Sabato batted .292 with six doubles, seven home runs and 18 RBIs with 22 walks before the season was cut short due to the coronavirus pandemic.

Professional career
Sabato was selected 27th overall by the Minnesota Twins in the 2020 Major League Baseball draft. Sabato signed with the Twins for a $2.75 million bonus.

Sabato made his professional debut in 2021 with the Fort Myers Mighty Mussels of the Low-A Southeast and was promoted to the Cedar Rapids Kernels of the High-A Central during the season. Over 107 games between the two teams, he slashed .202/.373/.410 with 19 home runs and 57 RBIs. He registered a 32.1% strikeout rate alongside a 19.8% walk rate. Sabato returned to Cedar Rapids to begin the 2022 season. He batted .226 with 17 home runs and 57 RBIs in 80 games with the team before being promoted to the Double-A Wichita Wind Surge.

Personal
Sabato's older brother, Teddy, played college baseball at UNC before transferring to Manhattan College. His father, Ted, is a police officer who played baseball at Mercy College.

References

External links

North Carolina Tar Heels bio

1999 births
Living people
Baseball first basemen
North Carolina Tar Heels baseball players
Baseball players from New York (state)
People from Rye Brook, New York
Cedar Rapids Kernels players
Wichita Wind Surge players